Club Cristóbal Colón de Ñemby is a football club based in the city of Ñemby in the Central Department of Paraguay.

The club currently competes in the Divisional B, Paraguay's third division.

References

Football clubs in Paraguay